Zelinje is a village in the municipality of Zvornik, Bosnia and Herzegovina.

Demographics
At the 2013 census, Zelinje had 424 inhabitants, made up of:

References

Populated places in Zvornik